Lyman Glacier is in Wenatchee National Forest in the U.S. state of Washington and is just northeast of Chiwawa Mountain. Lyman Glacier terminates at a proglacial lake and a series of smaller lakes as well as a pronounced terminal moraine indicate where the glacier once extended to.

See also
List of glaciers in the United States

References

Glaciers of the North Cascades
Glaciers of Chelan County, Washington
Glaciers of Washington (state)